Alex Adair (born 3 March 1993) is an English DJ, producer and remixer from West Chiltington. 
He attended The College of Richard Collyer and Canterbury Christ Church University where he studied Creative Music Technology.

He is best known for his remix of Ed Sheeran's single "Thinking Out Loud" and the 2014 single "Make Me Feel Better", which entered at number 13 on the UK Singles Chart.

Discography

Singles

References

English electronic musicians
Living people
People from West Chiltington
1994 births
Tropical house musicians